Ancells Farm is a   nature reserve in Fleet in Hampshire. It is managed by the Hampshire and Isle of Wight Wildlife Trust.  It is part of Foxlease and Ancells Meadows, which is a Site of Special Scientific Interest.

This site has heathland and ponds with diverse fauna and flora. It has many flying insects, which provide food for bats. Flora include bog myrtle, Bog asphodel and several species of orchid.

References

Hampshire and Isle of Wight Wildlife Trust